Gynandrae is a botanical name of an order of flowering plants. It was used in the Wettstein system for the order containing the orchids and is a descriptive name referring to the stamens.  The Bentham & Hooker and the Engler systems also used a descriptive name for this order, but preferred the name Microspermae. 

In taxonomical systems these two descriptive names have now mostly dropped out of use, being displaced by the name Orchidales (formed from the family name Orchidaceae).

Gynandrae in the Wettstein system
 order Gynandrae
 family Orchideae

Historically recognized angiosperm orders